How to Be At Home is a Canadian short film, directed by Andrea Dorfman and released in 2020. A sequel to her 2010 short film How to Be Alone, the film illustrates a spoken word piece by poet Tanya Davis about coping with isolation during the COVID-19 pandemic.

The film was created for The Curve, a National Film Board of Canada film series about life during the pandemic. 

The film was named to the Toronto International Film Festival's year-end Canada's Top Ten list for short films.

References

External links
 

2020 films
2020 animated films
2020 short films
Canadian animated short films
Films directed by Andrea Dorfman
National Film Board of Canada animated short films
Films about the COVID-19 pandemic
2020s English-language films
2020s Canadian films